Deng Lun (born 21 October 1992), also known as Allen Deng, is a Chinese film and television actor. He made his acting debut in the romance drama Flowers in Fog (2013). He also starred in the series Because of Meeting You (2017) and Ashes of Love (2018).

Early life 
Deng was born in Shijiazhuang, Hebei Province. His parents were reportedly in the military. He grew up with his grandparents and continues to spend time with his grandmother. In 2011, he graduated from the Performance Department of Shanghai Theatre Academy.

Career
Since his debut, Deng Lun has been named as one of China’s most accomplished actors, who has garnered both popular and critical acclaim. He is regarded as one of those rare combinations of "traffic and skill", as he can captivate the viewers to a show with his looks and popularity, but also has the skills to back it up. He was recognized by China Central Television (CCTV) for his outstanding performance in Faith Makes Great: Tianhe (2021). Among the "Post-90s Generation" of Chinese actors, he holds a string of viewership records, including being the actor with most television series with ratings breaking 1%, with five dramas (Because of Meeting You, Sweet Dreams, Ashes of Love, My True Friend, and Mr. Fighting). He is the only "Post-90s Generation" actor that holds two male lead dramas in the Top 10 of highest rated series of China Central Television (CCTV).

2012–2016: Career beginnings

In 2012, Deng Lun was picked by Chiung Yao to star in the romance series Flowers in Fog. Deng Lun played opposite Yang Zi (Bai Menghua) as Xu Hao. The drama aired in 2013, marking his debut.

In 2014, Deng Lun was featured in the period drama Moment in Peking. He played the female lead Yao Mulan's younger brother Yao Afei.

In 2015, Deng Lun starred in the urban family comedy series Dad to be Married, in which he played the ideal and aspiring big boy Su Da, watching over his half-sister and helping her find true love. He also co-starred with Sun Yi in the urban sitcom Love Upper Lot, playing the role of Sun Xiaofei, a business administration graduate with a fair-looking, shy and unsociable character. In the same year, Deng Lun began filming for Promise of Migratory Birds and the historical mythical drama Investiture of the Gods, his first historical drama. He also worked on two more drama projects, Brotherhood in War and White Deer Plain.

In 2016, Deng Lun co-starred with Zhang Ruoyun and Sun Yi in Promise of Migratory Birds, an urban youth idol drama adapted from the novel of the same name, playing the second male lead Liu Qianren who is cold in appearance but warm in heart. Deng Lun also appeared in the urban drama Super Cinderella, playing the female lead Du Qihua's younger brother, Du Qitian. In the same year, Deng Lun filmed the urban drama Graduation Season with Krystal Jung. He also began working on three more new TV series, Because of Meeting You, Princess Agents and Ode to Joy 2. On December 10, Deng Lun won the ‘Trending Young Actor of the Year’ award at the 10th Tencent Video Star Awards for his performance in Promise of Migratory Birds.

2017: Rising popularity

On March 2, the family series Because of Meeting You was premiered, with Deng Lun again starring with Sun Yi. The series’ ratings soared to No.1 throughout its broadcast, winning the national TV series concurrent viewership ratings with an average of 1.93% in 52 cities and an average of 3.26% on the national network, the highest ratings for a single episode exceeded 5%, and the number of online broadcasts surpassing the 7 billion mark. Because of Meeting You became the biggest dark horse of TV dramas in 2017. This drama set the record-ratings with an all-time series high.

On April 16, broadcast began for the critically acclaimed period drama White Deer Plain. Deng Lun gained recognition for his performance as the supporting role Lu Zhaohai, winning the Breakthrough Actor award at Weibo TV Drama Awards. He also won 2017’s Popular Artist award at the 6th iQIYI Scream Night Awards Ceremony. On May 11, the metropolitan romance series Ode to Joy 2 began premiering. Deng Lun played Xie Tong, a rising musician in his early twenties opposite Qiao Xin. Deng Lun also contributed two singles to the series’ soundtrack. On June 5, the historical action drama Princess Agents was premiered, with Deng starring opposite Zhao Liying. With an average audience rating of 1.741% and a market share of 10.84%, the drama was ranked as the champion of weekly dramas in 2017–2018.

Deng Lun continued working on new series. Blossom in Heart’s filming began in February, Ashes of Love in June, and Sweet Dreams in October.

2018: Breakthrough and career peak

In March, Deng Lun participated in Who's the Keyman, a 13-episode variety game show that challenged the players’ strength in deductive reasoning. Deng Lun went on to win the season's ‘Almighty Reasoning King’ title. He is widely known to excel in logical reasoning.

In May, Deng Lun began filming for the TV series My True Friend alongside Angelababy. On June 25, the romance drama Sweet Dreams was premiered. Deng Lun starred as the male lead opposite Dilraba Dilmurat. The series’ concurrent viewership ratings ‘broke 1%’, with an average of 1.018% in 52 cities. Sweet Dreams was one of the Top 20 highest rated dramas in 2018. The series reached 6 billion views before the drama wrapped its run. His romance drama Ashes of Love began premiering from August 2 – September 4, with Deng co-starring with Yang Zi. Since the broadcast, the series’ ratings climbed to No.1, the concurrent viewership ratings of 52 Cities ‘broke 1.3%’, and the highest view count for a single day was 41,208,066 views on September 2. The series reached 100 million views in just 15 minutes after the broadcast of the first episode. Ashes of Love became 2018 summer vacation's national ratings champion.

In October, Deng Lun began filming for the drama Mr. Fighting. In the same month, he filmed for the variety show Treasure in the Forbidden City, China's first cultural innovation reality show for The Palace Museum, serving as the host and The Forbidden City's Cultural and Creative New Product Development Officer. The show hit No.1 on TV premiere and dual smartphone networks, No.1 in the country for TV ratings, and No.1 in popularity on the entire network.

Deng Lun also contributed songs for Treasure in the Forbidden City, as well as Sweet Dreams and Ashes of Love series' soundtracks. Starring as the male lead in two 2018's highly rated TV series Sweet Dreams and Ashes of Love ushered in the peak of Deng Lun's acting career. Ashes of Love became a commercial success with high ratings and positive reviews both domestically and internationally. Deng Lun received widespread acclaim for his performance and experienced a surge in popularity.

2019: Mainstream popularity

On February 4, Deng Lun participated in CCTV New Year's Gala for the first time, he performed the song "I Strive in Happiness" next to William Chan and Jackie Chan. On March 30, Deng Lun appeared as a resident member in the escape room themed series Great Escape (China). Investiture of the Gods, the historical mystical drama filmed four years ago, finally received an airdate on April 8. Deng Lun was 23 when he played the role of the bewitching nine-tailed fox demon king Zi Xu. The series’ concurrent viewership ratings ‘broke 1%’, with an average of 1.061% in 55 cities.

On May 19, My True Friend began premiering. The series’ concurrent viewership ratings ‘broke 1%’, with an average of 1.093% in 55 cities. Deng Lun's performance in the heart-warming series earned him a nomination for ‘Best Actor in a Leading Role’ at the Asian Television Awards and ‘Best Actor (Emerald Category)’ at the 6th Actors of China Awards Ceremony; the series won ‘Special Award for Overseas Drama’ at the 13th Tokyo International TV Drama Festival. On July 31, Mr. Fighting began broadcast. Deng Lun starred in the leading role Hao ZeYu, an actor who tries hard to regain his fame alongside Ma Sichun. Deng Lun also contributed a single to the series’ soundtrack. Since its broadcast, the series’ real- time broadcast ratings ‘broke 2%’, and it became the national ratings champion.

On August 19, Deng Lun began filming for The Yin-Yang Master movie in Hengdian World Studios. On October 24, the period romance drama Blossom in Heart began premiering. Deng Lun played the main lead alongside Li Yitong. Blossom in Heart became the broadcast's platform's (MGTV) annual champion. Within the first 24 hours of airing, the viewership broke 200 million views. Deng Lun was the No.1 drama actor on Vlinkage New Media Index.

2020–2021: Continued international and domestic success

In mid-June 2020, Deng Lun participated in the anti-epidemic drama With You. Deng Lun played a leading role in one of the chapters titled I am Dalian. Deng Lun's episodes were aired on October 6, with ratings ‘breaking 1%’ on multiple networks.

On December 25, 2020, The Yin-Yang Master: Dream of Eternity film was screened nationwide in China, starring Deng Lun as warrior Boya and Mark Chao as Qingming. This was Deng Lun's first movie; his acting skills were well received by the public. The film was a box office success as it raked in a record of ¥452 million 10 days after its official theatrical release. Netflix acquired the international rights, and it was then launched in more than 190 countries and regions.

On December 28, 2020, Deng Lun's closing credits soundtrack titled Tomb of Infatuation for the movie The Yin-Yang Master: Dream of Eternity hit No.1 on QQ Music, KuGou Music, and DouYin. On January 5-6, 2021, the closing credits soundtrack also hit No.1 on the Asian New Songs Chart. The ‘Asian New Songs Chart’ is a list of new Asian popular/trending music jointly created by Ali Music, Sina Weibo, Sina Entertainment, and Youku Tudou. It also hit No.1 in Migu Music's first half of 2021 film OST ranking chart. Despite popular demand, he is unwilling to pursue singing as it detracts him from his acting career; for that, he is popularly known as ‘a singer mistaken as an actor’.

On January 7, 2021, the period drama Brotherhood in War filmed in 2016 finally began broadcast on a domestic channel. Deng Lun played Ma ChuXi, the protagonist's adopted brother; he received praise for his acting skills and for accomplishing his complicated role brilliantly.

On July 20, 2021, Deng Lun began filming the drama Night Wanderer with co-star Ni Ni, marking Deng Lun's comeback drama after almost 3 years since 2019. The drama is adapted from the popular novel of the same name by author Zhao Xizhi.

On February 21, 2022, Deng Lun starred in Gucci Love Parade advertisement campaign, becoming the first Chinese artist to appear in Gucci's global ready-to-wear commercial, together with Beanie Feldstein, Jared Leto, Lee Jung-jae, Liu Wen, Miley Cyrus, and Snoop Dogg.

2022: Tax evasion controversy 

On March 15, 2022, Deng Lun was fined US$16.6 million for tax evasion. Subsequently, he  apologised on his personal social media account. Eventually, his studio's as well as his social media accounts were suspended and made unavailable.

Endorsements 
He has served as brand ambassador for brands like Bvlgari, L’Oreal, Ralph Lauren, Roger Vivier, and Bally. Within a year, he achieved the grand slam for the “Big 5” men's magazines in China with appearances in Harper's Bazaar Men, GQ, Elle Men, L’Officiel Hommes, and Esquire, another first for the “Post-90s Generation”.

Filmography

Television series (drama)

Variety shows

Discography

Voice over

Awards and nominations

Honors and recognition

Endorsements and business cooperation

References

External links
 Deng Lun on Sina Weibo

Chinese male television actors
21st-century Chinese male actors
1992 births
Living people
Male actors from Hebei
Shanghai Theatre Academy alumni